Wuzhi County is a county in the northwest of Henan province, China, situated on the northern (left) bank of the Yellow River. It is the easternmost county-level division of the prefecture-level city of Jiaozuo.

Administrative divisions
As 2016, this county is divided to 7 towns and 7 townships.
Towns

Townships

Climate

References

County-level divisions of Henan
Jiaozuo